Dog n Suds is a midwestern United States-based chain of hot dog and root beer drive-in style eateries. The chain was started in 1953 and by the 1970s the franchise included over 650 restaurants across 38 states. In 2021, the brand continues to operate at approximately 15 locations and serves hamburgers, french fries and soft drinks.

History
The first Dog n Suds was opened in 1953 in Champaign, Illinois, by Champaign High School music teachers James Griggs and Don Hamacher. The second restaurant was opened after the owners were paid to build another by a wealthy patron and from there the owners decided to create a franchise. A training center was established in Champaign, named "Rover College" after the dog on the restaurant signage. At its peak in 1968, the chain had about 650 restaurants.

In the early 1970s Griggs sold his interest in the business and a few years later in 1974 the company was sold to Frostie Enterprises who owned the Frostie and Stewart's brands of root beer.

In 1991, the VanDames purchased the Dog n Suds trademark and identity rights. In 2001, they created a new company, TK&C's LLC, to administer licensing rights for the brand.

References

Further reading
Carolyn Walkup "Dog n Suds operators gear for revival push - Company Profile". Nation's Restaurant News. July 17, 1995. FindArticles.com. Retrieved 26 April 2007.
Carolyn Walkup "Classic Dog n Suds Drive-In chain strives for a comeback - Company Profile". Nation's Restaurant News. Oct 19, 1998. FindArticles.com.  Retrieved 26 April 2007.

External links 
 

Restaurants in Indiana
Economy of the Midwestern United States
Regional restaurant chains in the United States
Restaurants established in 1953
Drive-in restaurants
Root beer stands
Hot dog restaurants in the United States
Root beer
American soft drinks
1953 establishments in Illinois